Piotrówka  is a village in the administrative district of Gmina Trzcinica, within Kępno County, Greater Poland Voivodeship, in west-central Poland.

The village has a population of 390.

References

Villages in Kępno County